Rewalsar may refer to:

Rewalsar Lake
Rewalsar, India